The 37th Separate Guards Motor Rifle Don Cossack Budapest Red Banner Order of the Red Star Brigade named after Ye. A. Shchadenko is a motor rifle brigade of the Russian Ground Forces (Military Unit Number 69647). It is stationed at Kyakhta in Buryatia, part of the 36th Combined Arms Army of the Eastern Military District. The brigade fought in the War in Donbas and the 2022 Russian invasion of Ukraine.

Components 
Due to its location in Kiakhta in Buryatia, this brigade has a high percentage of Buryat and other ethnic minority servicemen, many of whom adhere to Tibetan Buddhism. As a result, by 2021 it was the only Russian military unit with a Buddhist lama serving as a military chaplain.

The brigade included more than 200 tracked vehicles and more than 100 wheeled vehicles in 2013. According to 2015 data, the brigade was equipped with 40 T-72B3, 1 T-72BK, 120 BMP-2, 15 MT-LB, 18 BM 2B17-1 Tornado-G, 36 2S3M Akatsiya 152mm howitzers, 18 120mm mortar 2S12 Sani, 6 100 mm MT-12 Rapira, 12 9K114 Shturm-S, 36 BTR-80, 12 BM 9A33BM2(3) Osa, 6 BM 9A34(35) Strela-10, and 6 ZSU 23-4 Shilka.

History 
On 1 June 2009, the 5th Guards Tank Division became the 37th Guards Motor Rifle Brigade, as part of the 2008 Russian military reforms. The 5th Guards Tank Division (Second Formation) itself dated to 1965, and its predecessor 5th Guards Cavalry Corps to 1942.

Donbass (2014-2022) 
Elements of the brigade fought in the War in Donbas and were located in the Northern operational area in February 2015. The 37th's troops fought in the Battle of Debaltseve during this time, where their heavy equipment and weaponry was crucial to the defeat of Ukrainian forces in the battle. In September 2016, a conscript from the brigade was run over by a Kamaz truck while sleeping during an exercise. A large number of incidents and deaths in the brigade were reported during the 2010s, including two court cases involving beatings by superiors, suicides, and accidental shootings. Conscripts of the brigade repeatedly complained to the Commissioner for Human Rights of Buryatia regarding extortion by the unit before their demobilization, poor clothing, and inadequate medical care.

Russian invasion of Ukraine 
The brigade was committed to the 2022 Russian invasion of Ukraine. Elements of the brigade participated in the Kyiv offensive. On 23 March, Ukrainian journalist Roman Tsimbalyuk posted a video showing brigade commander Colonel Yuri Medvedev being evacuated after having been run over by his own troops due to reportedly being dissatisfied with the about 50 percent casualties that the unit had suffered during their fight at the battle of Makariv. Colonel Medvedev later died in hospital. This was widely repeated by Western intelligence officials as a sign of widespread Russian demoralization during the war. After the Russian retreat from Kyiv Oblast, the brigade was redeployed to eastern Ukraine. 

On 20 April, residents of Kyakhta, the city of the unit's garrison, purchased a quadrocopter UAV to be sent to the brigade in Ukraine using funds from a donation drive.

Elements of the 37th Separate Guards Motor Rifle Brigade are suspected of participation to war crimes in Motyzhyn near Bucha during the 2022 Russian invasion of Ukraine.

Structure 
The brigade includes:

 Headquarters
 1st, 2nd, 3rd motor rifle battalions
 Rifle company (sniper)
 Tank battalion
 1st and 2nd self-propelled howitzer battalions
 Reactive Artillery Battalion
 Anti-Tank Artillery Battalion
 Anti-Aircraft Missile Battalion
 Anti-Aircraft Missile Artillery Battalion
 Reconnaissance Battalion
 Engineer Battalion
 Chemical Defense Company
 Headquarters Battalion (communications)
 UAV company
 Electronic Warfare Company
 Headquarters and artillery reconnaissance battery (chief of artillery)
 Repair and Recovery Battalion
 Materiel Support Battalion
 Commandant's Company
 Medical Company

See also
33rd Motor Rifle Division
List of Russian generals killed during the 2022 invasion of Ukraine
Fragging

Notes

References

Mechanised infantry brigades of Russia